Mark Lawrence is an English professional darts player who plays in Professional Darts Corporation (PDC) events.

Career

Lawrence qualified for the 2007 PDC World Darts Championship, and lost in the first round to Terry Jenkins by 3 sets to 1.

Lawrence made a name for himself at the 2009 UK Open. He defeated Steve Brown, Mark Dudbridge and Colin Lloyd on his way to the quarter-finals, where he was whitewashed 0–10 by eventual champion Phil Taylor.

World Championship results

PDC

2007: First round (lost to Terry Jenkins 1–3)

External links

Living people
English darts players
Professional Darts Corporation former tour card holders
Year of birth missing (living people)